Korra Sadat is a village in Allahabad Mandal, Fatehpur district, in the state of Uttar Pradesh, India. 
Korra Sadat is 20 km from its district main city Fatehpur and 140 km from its state main city Lucknow. The national highway ( g.t. road) is only 5 km from village. Even Delhi- Kolkata railway line is only 4 km from the village. So it is connected to all major cities. There is a  famous temple of KALI MATA which is more than 150 years old. There is a  famous Neem tree in this temple which is very large. there are three school and one inter college in the village. 80%  people of village are educated. People of two communities used to live there i.e. Hindus and Muslims.

One part of village is full of Hindus and another part is full of Muslims. Everybody used to live here with peace and use to behave friendly to each other. The Village is covered with sub boundaries of Ahiran Ka Purva, Buchhi Ka Purva, Dalpatpur and Kumharan Ka Purva. These are the sub part of the village. The Hindu community used to celebrate the festival like Holi and Deewali with full Panoply while Muslims celebrate their Eid Festival with meeting each other. In the time of Navratri Hindu community establish the sculpture of Durga Mata and Celebrate the festival up to 9 days. Every night Durga Jagaran program take place and thereafter villagers Immerse the Sculpture in the Ganges river. Muslims Also celebrate the Program of "Qawwali"(a style of Sufi devotional music marked by rhythmic improvisatory repetition of a short phrase) every year with full Panoply.
                                                                                                             
Cultural programs are the part of the life of villagers. Farming is the main occupation of the village and it is the main source of the living and income. A lot of people of the village are also working as government employee and living outside the village. Cricket is one of the most popular game of the village and tournaments used to take place in the village very often. There are 3-4 cricket teams in the village.

Villages in Fatehpur district